Jacquelin is a name. It is similar to Jacqueline.

List of people with the given name 

 Jacquelin de Ferrière, 13th century French knight
 Jacquelin Holzman (born 1935), Canadian politician, mayor of Ottawa
 Jacquelin Magnay, Australian journalist
 Jacquelin Martin, wife of Al Molinaro
 Jacquelin Maycumber, American politician
 Jacquelin Perry (1918–2013), American physician
 Jacquelin Perske, TV writer
 Jacquelin Smith Cooley (1883–1965), American botanist and pathologist

List of people with the surname 

 E. Jacquelin Dietz, American statistician
 Edmond Jacquelin (1875–1928), French cyclist
 Émilien Jacquelin (born 1995), French bi-athlete
 Françoise-Marie Jacquelin (1602–1645), Acadian heroine
 Jacques-André Jacquelin (1776–1827), French poet
 Lawrence Jacquelin (1923–1992), American NASCAR driver
 Marguerite Jacquelin (1850s–1941), French painter
 Raphaël Jacquelin (born 1974), French golfer

See also 

 Jacqueline (disambiguation)

Given names
Surnames
French-language surnames
Surnames of French origin
French feminine given names
French masculine given names
English-language feminine given names